Following his election victory in 2020, U.S. president Joe Biden had 4,000 political appointments to make to the federal government. Of those 4,000 political appointments, more than 1250 require Senate confirmation. Upon taking office, Biden quickly placed more than 1,000 high-level officials into roles that did not require confirmation. , according to tracking by The Washington Post and Partnership for Public Service, 518 nominees have been confirmed by the United States Senate, 1 have been announced, 78 are being considered by the Senate, and 82 tracked positions have no nominee.

Color key

Executive Office of the President

Office of the Vice President of the United States

Office of the First Lady of the United States

Federal executive departments

Department of State

Department of the Treasury

Department of Defense

Department of Justice

Department of the Interior

Department of Agriculture

Department of Commerce

Department of Labor

Department of Health and Human Services

Department of Housing and Urban Development

Department of Transportation

Department of Energy

Department of Education

Department of Veterans Affairs

Department of Homeland Security

Independent intelligence agencies

Office of the Director of National Intelligence

Central Intelligence Agency

Cabinet-level independent agencies

Environmental Protection Agency

Small Business Administration

Other independent agencies

Federal Reserve System

National Aeronautics and Space Administration

National Foundation on the Arts and the Humanities

Office of Personnel Management

United States Agency for International Development

United States Trade and Development Agency

Federal regional agencies

Independent banks

Independent boards

Independent commissions

Independent foundations

Independent miscellaneous

Board of directors of independent agencies

Independent non-profit corporations

Withdrawn nominations

See also 
 Cabinet of Joe Biden, for the vetting process undergone by top-level roles including advice and consent by the Senate
 List of ambassadors appointed by Joe Biden
 Joe Biden Supreme Court candidates
 List of United States attorneys appointed by Joe Biden
 List of federal judges appointed by Joe Biden

Notes 

Confirmations by roll call vote

Confirmations by voice vote

References 

+
2020s politics-related lists
Lists of political office-holders in the United States
21st-century American politicians
 
Joe Biden-related lists